Stephen Neal Lembo (November 13, 1926 – December 4, 1989) was an American catcher in Major League Baseball. Born in Brooklyn, New York, he played seven games for the Brooklyn Dodgers during the 1950 and 1952 baseball seasons. He was also with the Dodgers late in the 1951 season, and though he did not appear in any games, he was a bullpen catcher warming up Carl Erskine and Ralph Branca in the deciding National League playoff game against the New York Giants that was ended by Bobby Thomson's "Shot Heard 'Round the World" (as revealed by author Joshua Prager in his book The Echoing Green).

After retiring as a ballplayer in 1954, Lembo became a scout for the Dodgers, serving in that role until his death. He died at age 63 in Flushing, Queens.

References

External links

1926 births
1989 deaths
Baseball players from New York (state)
Brooklyn Dodgers players
Brooklyn Dodgers scouts
Fort Worth Cats players
Hollywood Stars players
Johnstown Johnnies players
Los Angeles Dodgers scouts
Major League Baseball catchers
Mobile Bears players
Montreal Royals players
Newport News Dodgers players
Pueblo Dodgers players
St. Paul Saints (AA) players
Sportspeople from Brooklyn
Baseball players from New York City
Zanesville Dodgers players